The J.H. Thedinga House is a historic building located in Dubuque, Iowa, United States.  Thedinga was a native of Hanover who settled in Dubuque in 1839.  He studied law, but never practiced it.  He was an early settler here and was engaged in retail.  Thedinga  also held a variety of political positions, including mayor.  The two-story brick structure features crow-stepped gables on the sides.  It was built as an addition to a frame house in 1855.  The frame structure was removed some time between 1885 and 1900.  The brick structure was altered at that time so that the library was converted into a kitchen and dining room, the parlor was divided into two sections, and the lower and upper porches were added to the south side.  The house was individually listed on the National Register of Historic Places in 1976, and it was included as a contributing property in the Cathedral Historic District in 1985.

References

Houses completed in 1855
Houses in Dubuque, Iowa
National Register of Historic Places in Dubuque, Iowa
Houses on the National Register of Historic Places in Iowa
Individually listed contributing properties to historic districts on the National Register in Iowa
1855 establishments in Iowa